is a Super Robot anime series created by Yoshiyuki Tomino and Yoshitake Suzuki, featuring character design by Yoshikazu Yasuhiko and produced by Sunrise. It was first broadcast on Japanese TV in 1977. The series lasted for 23 episodes.

Story 
There once existed a planet named Beal, until it was wiped out by the mysterious entity known as Gaizok.  The few remaining survivors escaped to Earth and split into three families, named Jin, Kamie, and Kamikita respectively.  While attempting to start a new life, the collectively known "Jin Family" prepared for the inevitable Gaizok invasion on Earth and its giant mechanical beasts known as "Mecha Boosts".  In order to defend their new home, they have built three vehicles which when combined form the mighty Zambot 3.  The Jin Family must not only defend against Gaizok attacks, but also harsh criticisms from the very people they protect, who blame the Jin Family for the invasion in the first place.

The show begins as a typical Super Robot anime, but made an effort to give a realistic explanation to the "strangeness" seen in precedent anime. It gives a rational explanation "why young children are chosen for the pilots", and tries to depict civilians' sufferings under the invasion of aliens. A much darker twist begins in episode 16 with the introduction of the cruel Human Bombs, which within two episodes leads to deaths that tug on the audience's heartstrings. Indeed, most protagonists are killed in the tragic ending. For these reasons, Zambot 3 is regarded as the most important forerunner to the Real Robot anime.

Characters

Jin Family

Zambot 3 Crew
Kappei Jin is the main character of Zambot 3 and pilot of the Zambird/Zambo Ace as well as controlling the primary functions of the titular robot.  At 12 years old, Kappei is always eager to get into dangerous, high-risk situations, be it in battle against one of Gaizok's Mecha Boosts or against his rival Kōzuki.  While Kappei is generally willing to go into battle, he will at times run into an emotional dilemma, generally stemming from civilian backlash against the Beal-Seijin. Kappei is also very athletic and a skilled martial artist. His best friends are his pet dog, Chiyonishiki and the girls Aki and Michi. Out of the entire team, Kappei is the only member to survive the final battle, as Uchūta and Keiko perish in a successful suicide attack, Chiyonishiki is killed when the Zambo Ace's right lower leg (which houses his cockpit) is destroyed, and the rest of the Jin Family dies when their ship burns up while they are giving Kappei time to escape.

Chiyonishiki is Kappei's pet dog akita inu and his faithful friend, who "copilots" Zambird alongside Kappei. Yoshinori Kanada of Studio Z misunderstood him as a robot dog, so there are some scenes which implicate his robotic nature.

Uchūta Kamie is 15 years old and pilot of the Zambull.  While Uchūta is more mature than Kappei, he is about as eager to jump into battle, to the point that early on in the series Kappei and Uchūta would argue over who should be doing most of the fighting.  Uchūta has to deal with a family that is not as devoted to the fight against Gaizok as himself. In the final battle, he and Keiko perish in a successful suicide attack.

Keiko Kamikita is 14 years old and pilots of the Zambase. On the Kamikita's ranch, Keiko's hobbies are archery and horseback riding.  While not as overtly aggressive as her male teammates, Keiko is if anything more willing to fight Gaizok, even at times attempting to pilot despite bodily injury.  While Keiko has the strongest convictions of the team, she is also perhaps the most emotionally vulnerable. One of Keiko's most famous lines is, "Please transform, and don't make a girl say 'please!'" In the final battle, she and Uchūta perish in a successful suicide attack.

Other Jin Family members
Heizaemon Kamikita is Keiko's grandfather and commander of the King Beal.

Gengoroh Jin is Kappei's father.

Ichitaroh Jin is Kappei's older brother.

Hanae Jin is Kappei's mother and the only family survivor of the Jin family. Including Kappei.

Umee Jin is Kappei's grandmother.

Humans
Shingo Kōzuki is 13 years old and the leader of a local gang of kids.  Shingo (most frequently referred to as Kōzuki in the series) is essentially Kappei's rival, as both have tendencies to play in the most dangerous ways possible, e.g. fighting each other with anchors.  Like Kappei, Shingo is a skilled martial artist.  Shingo is a civilian and does not pilot any anti-Gaizok vehicles, but he is nevertheless thrust into the middle of the conflict due to both circumstances beyond his control and through his own actions.   Shingo has a mother and a sister, Kaoru, of whom he is very protective.

Kaoru Kōzuki is Shingo's little sister.  Unlike most others, Kaoru sees the Jin Family and particularly Kappei as good people.

Aki is 12 years old and can be seen as Kappei's "love interest."  Along with her best friend, Michi, Kappei frequently takes them along on his adventures, both in and out of Zambird.  Aki is very sensible and confident, and will give Kappei a few harsh words if need be.  At the same time, she is rather impressed by Kappei and the Zambird.  The Zambot Archives book refers to Aki and Michi as the "Kappei Fan Club." He is killed with a Human Bomb.

Michi is 12 years old and best friends with Aki.  Michi, like Aki, tends to follow Kappei for one reason or another.  Shyer and more reserved than Aki, Michi is usually worried about what will happen to them whenever Kappei does anything dangerous/stupid.  The Zambot Archives book refers to Aki and Michi as the "Kappei Fan Club."

Hamamoto is 12 years old and the first child Kappei finds with a Human Bomb in his back. Kappei tries to save Hamamoto, but there is no way to do so. Hamamoto leaves with the other people implanted with Human Bombs so that they will not kill more people when they explode, but breaks down and cries for his already-dead parents to save him, before exploding.

Kenta is 12 years old and Kappei's second friend who has a bomb.

Gaizok
Gaizok is the mysterious entity responsible for the destruction of the planet Beal.  He seeks to do the same to Earth as he did to Beal, and perhaps other planets as well.  No one knows Gaizok's true motives or even his true identity, including his subordinate, Killer the Butcher. In the last episodes, Gaizok is revealed to be an extremely evolved artificial intelligence, that was once created by an ancient, super-advanced civilization, with the task of destroying anyone that would display aggressive feelings. But, having turned mad with old age, Gaizok has come to the conclusion that every feelings are dangerous and must be suppressed, meaning the destruction of all sentient beings.

Killer the Butcher is the most prominent villain in Zambot 3.  Butcher is responsible for sending out Mecha Boosts to attack the Earth, particularly Japan.  Butcher is a rather eccentric villain, and is seen constantly indulging in luxuries, be it eating endless amounts of meat, trying on jewelry, or attempting to sun bathe despite being inside of the Bandok.  However, this extravagance does not make him any less ruthless.  Butcher was sent to kill the humans, and that's exactly what he plans to do.  Butcher's headquarters is the powerful mobile fortress, Bandok.

Gizzar is Butcher's right-hand man and field commander coming up with diabolical plots. Unlike Butcher he takes his job very seriously and is very thin, but he is still just as ruthless. Gizzar is often Butcher's whipping boy whenever something goes wrong.

Barettar is a field commander nearly identical to Gizzar except for muscular and has scars all over his face.

Zubutar is the Bandok's chief designer of the Mecha-Boosts.

Snai-Sworders are small snail-like reconnaissance robots used by Butcher to observe battles. They possess no offensive capabilities.

Bandok is the four-legged robot space fortress commanded by Butcher. For the first nine episodes it serves as only a headquarters near Earth's orbit where Mecha-Boosts are produced. In episode ten it comes to Earth and releases a series of Beltar Tanks to defend itself. After Mecha-Boost Tracid is destroyed, Zambot 3 attempts to attack only for a barrier to knock it away. In the next episode it is forced to flee back into space after being destroyed internally by Zambo Ace. Returns to Earth in episode 18 as the primary facility for converting humans into living bombs, keeping itself underwater at well over twelve hundred meters below the surface until Zambot 3 discovers its location. The head detaches itself and starts firing extremely large torpedoes at Zambot 3 from its mouth as well as stops the Moon Attack with an energy barrier. It retreats to space again in episode 19 after large quantities of damage and the energy barrier being destroyed by Zambot 3's Moon Attack and destruction of Mecha-Boost Gaidar. In episode 21 the Bandok uses well over two thousand space mines and homing missiles with eyeballs for nose cones called Gaizok Missiles to attack the King Beal as the Jin family approaches for the final battle. When King Beal is close enough, each arm of the Bandok fires a Bandok Cannon presumably just as powerful as the Ion Cannon. After 2nd Beal rams into its underside the main body is ultimately destroyed with the head being all that is left. In its final battle in episode 22 the head piloted by Butcher fires Bandok Missiles and eye lasers only for it to be finished off by the Ion Cannon.

Red Knight Deathcain and Blue Knight Heldyne are the two knights of Gaizok sealed within the Bandok as its guardians. Both appearing in episode 22 after most of the Bandok was destroyed, Butcher is forced into battle by Gaizok with both of these death personified knights as a last resort. Both appear as European knights on horses. Each one is armed with a small round shield that fires lightning bolts that can be combined for an extremely bright flash that launches swords and maces, although Deathcain possesses a sword while Heldyne possesses a double sided lance.

Mecha-Boosts

Mecha-Boost Domira: Appears in episode 1. Appears as a humanoid with a chicken head and octopus arms. Uses tentacles armed with axes, energy blasts fired from the mouth, twin missiles from each hip, can extend its body using its stretchable midsection that also serves as the weak point. Killer The Butcher claims it is only a reconnaissance type.
Mecha-Boost Zidobirar: Appears in episode 2. Appears as a large frilled lizard with a torso and arms of a human attached to it with pendulum style axes for hands that can be launched. After arriving on Earth via a meteor, it burrows underground and launches highly accurate fire balls from the mouth that can even curve to hit its target. Also armed with a horn on its forehead and each side of its frill as well as a mace-like tail. The neck from the humanoid torso serves as the weak point  and can fire a green energy ray used to detonate short range missiles before they reach it and also fires a blue sonic cannon.
Mecha-Boost Gabidan: Appears in episode 3. First stage appears as a humanoid with a bird head and neck that can extend long distances, bird wings, meathook claws for hands and feet, and a face on its chest. Travels by levitation in a cumulonimbus cloud (most likely Incus class) and fires a freezing ray for the mouth on its chest that instantly turns humans and buildings into ice, making them extremely fragile. Second stage appears as a phoenix with a large eye on its chest. It is armed with red lightning spawned from the mouth and a long range flamethrower also from the mouth.
Mecha-Boost Doyozurar: Appears in episode 4. Appears as a tick with tentacled legs armed with pincers and a tentacled mouth with a face. Uses its six tentacled legs to destroy structures while levitating and later uses suction cups for literally sucking objects and opponents towards it. Tentacled mouth is armed with a flamethrower and missiles and can use its own teeth for quick strikes. Can rotate its body extremely fast to form a tornado and burrow underground for quick escapes. Doyozurar reappears in episode 20 with a no name Mecha-Boost, Garuchak, and Anmosgar.
Mecha-Boost Garunge: Appears in episode 5. Appears as a house fly with a pedal-like dish around its neck later used to protect the head and a cannon on each shoulder. Armed with fire balls from the mouth, can use the pedal like dish can form into a horn while protecting the head in a similar fashion to Gabura from the original Ultraman, a thick shell that can deflect regular laser attacks and projectiles as well as break the Zambo Cutter, can launch missiles from the cannons on its shoulders, and emit electrical pulses from its body. Its internal structure is exposed while its wings retract.
Mecha-Boost Elegin: Appears in episode 6. Its tail appears as a yellow flower with tentacles instead of pedals, the rest of the body looks similar to a turtle except with a frill on its shell and a blade on each front leg. Armed with a jamming signal, black toxic gas from its tentacles, can launch purple buzzsaw discs from its flower that act like boomerangs, launches missiles from the front part of its shell which can be replaced with large bony spikes, and emits lightning-like toxic gas from its mouth. It can also swim extremely fast while underwater for quick escapes, levitate, and will regenerate from attacks so long as the energy compartments in its back and tail are functioning.
Mecha-Boost Kumoganira: Appears in episode 7. Appears as a six-legged crab with a shower nozzle coming from the mouth. Armed with highly flammable purple gas, fire balls, and electric webs from its nozzle, thorny ropes from each claw that can emit electricity, a missile launcher in its forehead that can also fire drills that are rather weak, and claws thick enough to block the Zambot Buster. Moves entirely by using levitation.
Mecha-Boost Garuchak: Appears in episode 8. Appears as a demonic bat with wings on its arms that grant it flight on its upper half and a jellyfish with a face and two squid whip tentacles on its lower half. Armed with a very powerful flamethrower from the mouth from the head on its upper body, skin is covered in an alien metal that can deflect or redirect attacks, sonic waves from the wings on its arms, and fires missiles from the mouth on its lower half. Can be destroyed if hit in the inside of the mouth on its upper half. Garuchak reappears in episode 20 with a no name Mecha-Boost, Doyozurar, and Anmosgar. Unlike the first version this one launches fire balls instead of missiles from the mouth on its lower half.
Mecha-Boost Anmosgar: Appears in episode 9. Appears as a turtle with dog ears, masks on each of its upper arms that can be launched as projectiles, and a tank from the waist down. Armed with a strong freeze gas from the mouth and will convert its body into highly magnetic timed hydrogen bombs if destroyed by combustion. Can fly and reform itself if the polarity of its bombs are unbalanced. Anmosgar reappears in episode 20 with a no name Mecha-Boost, Doyozurar, and Garuchak
Mecha-Boost Tracid: Appears in episode 10. Appears as a two headed robot with two cannons on each dome scalp, a large arrowheads for the right hand and a drill for the left hand, and treads for the feet of each leg. Capable of breaking down its body down as well as reform into double barreled tanks called Beltar Tanks that can fire missile shells and lasers, can fire very strong missile shells from the double barreled cannons on the top of each head, has thick tank armor to project it from normal attacks, can regenerate its drill hand after it is fired, and arrowhead hand can be launched while attached to an electric cable that will shock whatever grabs the arrowhead. Tracid reappears in episode 20 with Doyozurar, Garuchak, and Anmosgar, however, unlike the others it is transported to Earth using a no name Mecha-Boost and combines from Beltar tanks after King Beal's Ion Cannon destroys it. Unlike the first version, this one can fly.
Mecha-Boost Vibron: Appears in episode 11. Appears as a plesiosaur with tank treads on its shoulders, a mace tail capable of extending for constriction, and a hose for its mouth. Armed with a flamethrower in its hose mouth, missiles from in its front flippers, tank treads extend like whips that emit electricity as well as its tail, and an energy ray from its eyes used to destroy missiles. Moves entirely by using levitation.
Mecha-Boost Mogundar: Appears in episode 12. Appears as an elephant with a drill instead of a trunk as well as a drill on its scalp, large bladed ears and pincers, holes around the front feet that are presumably missile pods, tank treads for back feet, and a dish-like tail. Armed with armor that allows it to survive crashing from orbit, missiles from its mouth, both drills on its face capable of regenerating after launching as well as explode like bombs, and can regenerate if torn to pieces into Mecha-Boost Harindar. Can jump very high into the air using its powerful legs.
Mecha-Boost Harindar: Appears in episode 12. Appears very similar to Anguirus except with pincers at the mouth, five horns, three of which are on the nose, and tank treads for feet. Armed with spikes launched from its spiked carapace that regenerate after being launched and can spin itself very fast for a barrage attack.
Mecha-Boost Dabongar: Appears in episode 13. Appears as a humanoid with a face on its chest with drills for eyes as well as a mouth with large triangular teeth, two pincers for hands, a fan for its head, two electrodes on the scalp used to create an electric barrier, and skate-like wheels on each foot. Armed with extensible arms to give pincers greater distance, a flamethrower from the mouth on its chest as well as comb-like missiles, can emit electricity from its pincers, and the fan on its head can fire a volley of energy arrows.
Mecha-Boost Kamezon: Appears in episode 14. Appears as a snapping turtle with tentacles and a flower with a face and carnivorous teeth on its back and has rocket engines for its back legs. Armed with a red acid from the mouth, uses its tentacles to swat at targets, can launch rockets from its chest, and has sharp claws for fingers.
Mecha-Boost Deskamel: Appears in episode 15. Appears as a tyrannosaurus with spikes along the back of its long neck that can be used as missiles that regenerate after being launched and a flame at the tip of its tail that doesn't extinguish even while underwater. Armed with three cannons on its back, torpedo launchers from its abdomen, a laser from the oval on its scalp, two rocket launchers on its chest, and a flamethrower in its mouth.
Mecha-Boost BuuBon: Appears in episode 16. Appears as a jellyfish with an aircraft carrier of its head. Armed with a squad of mechanical sharks including one around 130 feet long, long extendable tentacles, green energy bolts from its head, and its hull is capable of deflecting Zambot 3's Zambot Cutter. The underside serves as its weak point, a simple attack will temporarily disable its levitation.
Mecha-Boost Hirayangar: Appears in episode 17 with four no name mecha-boosts. Appears as a humanoid with rocket engines from the waist down, sharp claws for hands, a fly-trap mouth for a torso, and a series of eyes connected to very skinny stalks. Armed with teeth capable of breaking the Zambot Grip, the eyes can emit bright flashes, claw hands can emit red lightning bolts upon stabbing into a target, can unleash volleys of rubbery meteors from its underside, and fire large rockets from the fly-trap mouth on its torso. Moves entirely by using levitation.
Mecha-Boost Kuragen: Appears in episode 18. Appears as a humanoid pear with a bird face on its torso and has tentacles for hair and fingers. Armed with green energy bolts from the eyes, finger tentacles can regenerated after being launched as highly electric rods, can spin tentacles around to deflect projectiles, can emit electricity upon grabbing a target, and can form an electric tornado on its underside to fly faster. Capable of flight as well as swimming.
Mecha-Boost Gorgas: Appears in episode 19. Appears as a mantid with a top for its lower half that allows it to swim to the surface from twelve thousand meters down to the surface in seconds as well as flight, a drill at the bottom of its top, and has wing-like structures instead of claws. Armed with red lasers from its eyes used for destroying objects or very bright flashes. It can also retract its upper half to use its top-like bottom half as a weapon.
Mecha-Boost Gaidar: Appears in episode 19. Appears as a golem with a trident tail. Armed with red lasers presumably identical to Gorgas's and can regenerate severed limbs in seconds.
Mecha-Boost Dangarun: Appears in episode 21. Appears as a humanoid bull with jet wings and a large cannon on its back that fires cannonballs, a launchable mace for its tail, and two smaller particle cannons on its shoulders that fire beams of electricity that destroys enemies on an atomic level and rivals the Moon Attack. After launching, the tail mace can eject the edges with thorny elastic wires to constrict its target
Mecha-Boost Zondar: Appears in episode 21. Appears as a four-armed humanoid with a bird head and mullet. Armed with four rapiers. Zondar is sometimes translated as Zondia.

Mechanical weapons and vehicles

Bealian machines

Zambot 3
Zambot 3, along with the King Beal, are the primary defenses against the Gaizok invasion.  Zambot 3 is formed when the Zambird, Zambull and Zambase combine by a sequence called Zambot Combination.  There is a separate cockpit for each pilot. In the final battle, the Zambull and Zambase are destroyed in Uchūta and Keiko's successful suicide attack, and the Zambo Ace is damaged beyond repair.

Height: 60 meters
Weight: 500 tons
Output: 350,000 horsepower (260 MW)
Energy source: Ion energy
Main weapons
Arm Punch – Retaining the launching fists of the Zambull, Zambot 3 fires its fist in typical super robot fashion.
Teisatsu Mecha Regon (Reconnaissance Mecha Regon) – Zambot 3 retains Zambase's remote cameras.
Zambot Grap – A pair of sai that can also join at the handles to transform into a double-sided lance, Zambot Blow, as well as a sword, Zambot Cutter.  The variations are often used one after the other and to adapt to different situations.
Buster Missile – Missiles fired from the pods on sides of Zambot 3's legs.
Zambot Buster – The pods on the side of Zambot 3's legs are thrown like shuriken, and will often hit the enemy twice.
Moon Attack – Energy is gathered from Zambot 3's hands to the moon on is forehead.  A crescent moon-shaped energy attack flies at the target, multiplies and surrounds it, then recombines and punches a crescent moon-shaped hole through the target.

Weaknesses: Zambot 3 has very few glaring design flaws, but the most prominent one is that its armor begins to fail when in waters deeper than 7000 meters.

Zambird/Zambo Ace
Pilot: Kappei Jin

Zambird is a high-speed aerial vehicle which is able to go faster than Japan Self-Defense Force fighter jets.  Zambird can transform into the humanoid Zambo Ace.  Zambo Ace's primary armament is its Zambo Magnum.  Zambird forms primarily the head and the inner torso of Zambot 3 and has two cockpits, with Kappei in the left and Chūnishiki in the right (which ultimately leads to the latter's demise).

Main Weapons

'Zambird'
Tremble Horn: A laser that is shot out of the parabolic dish on top of Zambird.
50mm Vulcans: Fired out of the front of Zambird.
Missiles
Rockets

'Zambo Ace'
Zambo Magnum: A large gun which can be outfitted with different parts to form not only a magnum but also a sniper rifle and rocket launcher.

Zambull
Pilot: Uchūta Kamie

Zambull is a tank-like vehicle that has the most hitting power out of the three parts of Zambot 3.  Zambull forms the outer torso and arms of Zambot 3, as evidenced by the large fists that sit on top of Zambull.

Main Weapons
Giant Cannon
Missiles
Arm Punch: Zambull fires its fist.
Drill Missiles

Zambase
Pilot: Keiko Kamikita

Zambase functions as both an attack and support vehicle.  In addition to possessing its own weapons for offense, Zambase also carries spare ammunition and Zambo Magnums for Zambo Ace, as well as remote cameras for reconnaissance.  Zambase forms primarily the legs of Zambot 3, and is also responsible for overseeing balance and power distribution throughout the entire robot.

Main Weapons
Base Laser
Base Fire
Missiles
Teisatsu Mecha Regon: Remote spy cameras

Video games
Zambot 3 has made an appearance in several Super Robot Wars titles.

External links

References
"". IMDB.

1977 anime television series debuts
Alien invasions in television
Fictional child soldiers
Sunrise (company)
Super robot anime and manga